Nerkin Chambarak or Nizhny Chambarak was a village in the Gegharkunik Province of Armenia, currently part of the town of Chambarak.

See also 
Gegharkunik Province

References 

Populated places in Gegharkunik Province